Keshav Atmanand Maharaj (born 7 February 1990) is a South African professional cricketer. 

Maharaj represents the South Africa national team in Tests, One Day International (ODI) and Twenty20 International (T20I) cricket. He is currently the vice-captain of the side in limited overs cricket. 

He made his debut in first-class cricket in 2006 and his Test debut in November 2016. 

As a left-arm orthodox spin bowler and lower-order batsman, he represents KwaZulu-Natal and Dolphins in domestic cricket. 

In June 2021, Maharaj became just the second bowler for South Africa to take a hat-trick in a Test match. In September 2021, Maharaj captained South Africa for the first time, in the second ODI against Sri Lanka. In September 2021, Maharaj made his T20I debut against Sri Lanka, captaining the team in his debut match.

Early life
Keshav was born on the beach of Durban to Atmanand and Kanchan Mala. His forefathers hailed from Sultanpur, Uttar Pradesh, India, and arrived in Durban in 1874.

Domestic career
Maharaj made his first-class debut at the age of 16 for KwaZulu-Natal in 2006–07. He was promoted to the Dolphins team in 2009–10.

Maharaj toured Bangladesh with the South Africa Academy in April–May 2010, taking 13 wickets in the two four-day matches against Bangladesh Cricket Board Academy. He also took 4 for 12 off four overs, opening the bowling, in one of the T20 matches. He played for South Africa A against the touring Bangladesh A team in 2010–11.

Maharaj's best season with the bat so far has been 2012–13, when he made 481 first-class runs at an average of 48.10, including two centuries. For KwaZulu-Natal against Northerns, he made 114 not out off 119 balls and finished off the match by taking 5 for 12.

For Dolphins against Cape Cobras in 2014–15, Maharaj took his best innings and match figures to that point: 6 for 58 and 10 for 145. Dolphins won, and he received the man of the match award. He finished the season with 44 first-class wickets at an average of 26.18.

Maharaj played for Cuckfield in the Sussex Premier League in 2013, and as Nelson's professional in the Lancashire League in 2015. He was included in the KwaZulu-Natal cricket team squad for the 2015 Africa T20 Cup.

In the first match of the 2016–17 season, playing for the Dolphins against the Warriors, Maharaj scored 72 then took 7 for 89 and 6 for 68 in an innings victory for the Dolphins, the first time he had taken seven wickets in an innings or 13 wickets in a match.

In October 2018, Maharaj was named in Durban Heat's squad for the first edition of the Mzansi Super League T20 tournament.

After appearing for Lancashire in 2018, Maharaj played five matches for Yorkshire in the 2019 County Championship, taking 38 wickets at an average of 18.92, as the team finished in 5th place.

In September 2019, Maharaj was named in the squad for the Durban Heat team for the 2019 Mzansi Super League tournament. In April 2021, he was named in KwaZulu-Natal's squad, ahead of the 2021–22 cricket season in South Africa.

On 27 February 2023, he joined Middlesex on an overseas registration for the LV= County Championship and the Vitality t20 Blast competitions.

He was later forced to withdraw due to an achilles tendon injury.

International career
In October 2016, Maharaj was named in South Africa's squad for their series against Australia. He made his Test debut against the Australians on 3 November 2016 and was instrumental in the collapse of Australian batting in the first innings by picking up three crucial wickets. He was the first specialist spinner to make his Test debut at Perth.

On 10 March 2017, against New Zealand, Maharaj took his maiden five-wicket haul in Tests. This was only the seventh five-for by a South African spinner in Tests against New Zealand.

In April 2017, Maharaj was named in South Africa's One Day International (ODI) squad for their series against England and the 2017 ICC Champions Trophy. He made his ODI debut for South Africa against England on 27 May 2017.

In May 2017, Maharaj was named International Newcomer of the Year at Cricket South Africa's annual awards. In October 2017, he took his 50th wicket in Tests, during the first Test against Bangladesh.

In July 2018, during the second Test match against Sri Lanka, Maharaj registered his best Test bowling figures in an innings of 9 for 129 and also registered the best ever bowling figures in a Test innings by a visiting bowler in Sri Lanka. He also recorded the best ever bowling figures in a Test innings by a South African in Asia. His figures of 9 for 129 are the second-best bowling figures by a South African in an innings of a Test after Hugh Tayfield and the best Test bowling figures by a South African since readmission to international cricket in 1991. He became the second left-arm spinner, after Rangana Herath, to claim 9 wickets in a test innings.

In August 2018, Maharaj was named in South Africa's Twenty20 International (T20I) squad for the one-off match against Sri Lanka, but he did not play in the fixture.

In October 2019, during the series against India, Maharaj took his 100th wicket in Test cricket.

In November 2020, Maharaj was named in South Africa's squad for their limited overs series against England.

On 21 June 2021, Maharaj took South Africa's second ever Test hat-trick, and first since Geoff Griffin at Lord's in 1960, during the fourth day of the second Test match of South Africa's tour of the West Indies. In September 2021, Maharaj was named in South Africa's squad for the 2021 ICC Men's T20 World Cup despite being uncapped in T20Is. He made his T20I debut on 10 September 2021, for South Africa against Sri Lanka, as the team's captain, and took a wicket with his first ball in T20Is. He also helped South Africa win the series 3-0 after South Africa lost the ODI series to Sri Lanka 2–1.

References

External links

 

1990 births
Living people 
Cricketers from Durban 
Dolphins cricketers
Durban Heat cricketers
Durban's Super Giants cricketers
KwaZulu-Natal cricketers
Lancashire cricketers
South African cricketers
South Africa Test cricketers
South Africa One Day International cricketers
South Africa Twenty20 International cricketers
South African people of Indian descent
Yorkshire cricketers
Alumni of Northwood School, Durban
People from eThekwini Metropolitan Municipality
Test cricket hat-trick takers
20th-century South African people
21st-century South African people